Joel Schürch (born 30 September 1994) is a Swiss rower. He competed in the 2020 Summer Olympics, held July–August 2021 in Tokyo.

References

1994 births
Living people
Swiss male rowers
Olympic rowers of Switzerland
Rowers at the 2020 Summer Olympics